Salem Tavern is a historic museum property at 800 South Main Street in Winston-Salem, Forsyth County, North Carolina.  It was a tavern in the 18th-century town of Salem, which is now part of Winston-Salem.  It is part of Old Salem Museums & Gardens and open as an Old Salem tour building to visitors.  Built in 1784 and enlarged in 1815, it was the first entirely brick building in what is now Old Salem, and is one of the oldest surviving brick tavern buildings in the United States.  It was declared a National Historic Landmark in 1964.

Description
The Salem Tavern is located on the west side of South Main Street, between Blum and East Walnut Streets.  It consists of two separate buildings, one brick and one wood frame.  Both are  stories in height, and have gabled roofs.  The brick building is set on a raised foundation, with a single-story shed-roof porch extending across the front, supported by square posts and accessed from the sidewalk by side-facing stairs.  The front portion of the building houses public rooms on the ground floor, and sleeping quarters for guests above, with the kitchen and landlord's quarters in an ell to the rear.  The adjacent wood-frame building housed additional sleeping quarters.

History
Constructed on the foundations of an earlier 1771 Tavern which burnt to the ground in 1784, the Salem Tavern was quickly rebuilt, because it formed an important function in the Moravian Church community which was a trade town.  Constructed by mason Johann Gottlob Krause using bricks already on hand for another building, the Tavern reopened quickly. The Tavern complex was later expanded by the construction of a wooden building to the north in 1815, then a building connected the two was constructed in 1832. A two-story porch was run across the three buildings in 1838, but has since been removed.  The Tavern was the lodgings for George Washington for two nights during his Southern Tour in 1791.

The Tavern and adjacent 1815 building have been restored to their original appearances.

Gallery

See also
List of National Historic Landmarks in North Carolina
National Register of Historic Places listings in Forsyth County, North Carolina

References

Sources
Old Salem: The Official Guidebook. Penelope Niven and Cornelia Wright. Old Salem Inc.: Winston-Salem, NC. 2000.

External links

Historic American Buildings Survey in North Carolina
Moravian settlement in North Carolina
National Historic Landmarks in North Carolina
Commercial buildings completed in 1784
Buildings and structures in Winston-Salem, North Carolina
Commercial buildings on the National Register of Historic Places in North Carolina
National Register of Historic Places in Winston-Salem, North Carolina
Museums in Winston-Salem, North Carolina
Historic district contributing properties in North Carolina